Asiarch (Greek Ἀσιάρχης, "ruler of Asia") was a prominent position in the Roman province of Asia, the nature of which is not entirely clear. The Asiarchs were probably the annual representatives of the most important cities in the province, who presided over the provincial assembly (koinon) and had to organize and carry out the public games in honor of the gods and in the imperial cult at their expense. Asiarchs were based in the cities where this festival took place and where the temples of the gods concerned were located, for example Ephesus and Pergamon. They were elected by the cities and confirmed by the proconsul. Asiarchs are known from numerous inscriptions, but are also mentioned in Acts (19:31) and in the Martyrdom of Polycarp..

In research, the identity of the Asiarchs with the "high priests of the (province) Asia" (archiereus tes Asias), whose ritual office is also linked to the imperial cult in selected cities in numerous inscriptions, is disputed. While most scholars take the traditional view that Asiarch and archiereus are two names for the same office, some researchers assume that the Asiarchs, unlike the high priests, held a local office.

Equivalents are known in other Roman provinces, e.g. Bithyniarch, Galatiarch and Lyciarch.

References

Further reading 
 Rosalinde A. Kearsley, "Asiarchs, archiereis, and the archiereiai of Asia", Greek, Roman and Byzantine Studies 27 (1986), pp. 183–192.
 Rosalinde A. Kearsley, "Asiarchs: Titulature and function. A reappraisal", Studii Clasice, 26 (1988), pp. 57–65.
 Peter Herz, "Asiarchen und Archiereiai. Zum Provinzialkult der Provinz Asia", Tyche, 7 (1992), S. 93–115.
 Steven J. Friesen, "Asiarchs", Zeitschrift für Papyrologie und Epigraphik, 126 (1999), pp. 275–290
 Steven J. Friesen, "Highpriests of Asia and Asiarchs. Farewell to the identification theory", in Peter Scherrer (ed.), Steine und Wege. Festschrift für Dieter Knibbe zum 65. Geburtstag. (Vienna: Österreichisches Archäologisches Institut, 1999), pp. 303–307 
 Helmut Engelmann, "Asiarchs", Zeitschrift für Papyrologie und Epigraphik 132 (2000), pp. 173–175
 Peter Weiß, "Asiarchen sind Archiereis Asias. Eine Antwort auf S. J. Friesen", in Widerstand – Anpassung – Integration. Die griechische Staatenwelt und Rom. Festschrift für Jürgen Deininger zum 65. Geburtstag. Steiner, Stuttgart 2002, pp. 241–254 
 Babett Edelmann-Singer, Koina und Concilia. Genese, Organisation und sozioökonomische Funktion der Provinziallandtage im römischen Reich (Stuttgart: 2015)

Ancient Roman titles